Carlos Woebcken (5 June 1901 – 12 July 1962) was a Brazilian athlete. He competed in the men's decathlon at the 1932 Summer Olympics.

References

1901 births
1962 deaths
Athletes (track and field) at the 1932 Summer Olympics
Brazilian decathletes
Olympic athletes of Brazil
Athletes from Hamburg